John Vernon (1932–2005) was a Canadian actor.

John or Jackie Vernon may also refer to:

John Vernon (of Clontarf) (c. 1618–1670), Quartermaster-General to Oliver Cromwell
John Vernon (athlete) (1929–2019), Australian high jumper
John Vernon (Australian actor) (1848–1921), aka Howard Vernon (Australian actor)
Jackie Vernon (footballer) (1918–1981), former Irish footballer 
Jackie Vernon (comedian) (1924–1987), American stand-up comedian, actor and voice artist
John Vernon (English cricketer) (1922–1994), English cricketer and Royal Navy officer
John Vernon (New Zealand cricketer) (1940-2005), New Zealand cricketer